Late Bhausaheb Hiray Smaranik Samiti Trust (LBHSST) (also known as Hiray College Or Bhausaheb Hiray College) is an Indian college. Its course include Master's degree in Computer Application, Architecture, Applied Arts and Interior Design.

Masters in computer applications
Information Technology Department was established in 1994, which started with MCA since 2001. This MCA programme is affiliated to University of Mumbai and approved by All India Council Of Technology. All students are selected on the basis of an entrance test covering topics on aptitude and computer concepts. It is a three-year full-time postgraduate course to which graduates from any field with mathematics at 10+2 level are eligible for admission. The duration of three years is divided in six semesters. The first Five semesters are class room training on theoretical concepts whereas 6th semester consist of Industrial Training to have hands on experience on live projects of industry. This helps them to get ready, to enter the industry. The final year includes one foreign language, which is mandatory for every student to go through. the curriculum has a strong core covering Information Technology, Business Management & Mathematics, along with the technical knowledge. Many students gets placed through campus recruitment.

External links

LBHSST on educationinfoindia.com
LBHSST, Bandra on Wikimapia

Universities and colleges in Mumbai